Endotricha luteopuncta is a species of snout moth in the genus Endotricha. It was described by Paul Ernest Sutton Whalley in 1963, and is known from the Solomon Islands.

References

Endotrichini
Moths described in 1963